Nausea was an American hardcore punk band from New York City, active from 1985 to 1992. They are cited as a notable band in the first wave of crust punk.

Prior to Nausea, guitarist Victor Dominicis played in the hardcore punk bands Hellbent and Sacrilege. Nausea were involved in the New York City Lower East Side squatting community. Their earlier sound with singers Amy Miret and Neil Robinson was in the vein of hardcore punk. After Robinson's departure, he was replaced by Al Long and the band began to experiment with darker, metal influences. Robinson went on to form the bands Jesus Crust and Final Warning, as well as start Tribal War Records.

Lyrics and musical style
Nausea's apocalyptic lyrics and artwork were influenced by the sociopolitical issues of the day, such as the Reagan Administration, the US-USSR Cold War, and threats of nuclear war with the USSR. Nausea focused on topics such as environmentalism, human extinction, pollution, and animal rights. 

Nausea progressed from having a very Discharge styled hardcore punk sound, to in its later years with new singer Al Long, having a more dark and metallic sound, similar to UK bands like Amebix and Axegrinder. The band broke new ground for the emerging crust punk genre, flirting with doom metal, d-beat, noise rock and sludge.
Band member John John Jesse describes their music by citing bands such as Discharge, Black Sabbath, Slayer, and Pink Floyd as influences. In their formative years, the founding members were compelled by the political and social messages that the band Crass would use to drive their music; their lyrics reflected their views on feminism, anti-racism, class conflict, and the opposition against war.

Later lineup
Nausea's final lineup was: John John Jesse (bass), Victor Venom (guitar, ex-Reagan Youth), Amy Miret (vocals), Al Long (vocals), and Roy Mayorga (drums). John John Jesse has gone on to become an artist, as well as joining with members of Choking Victim in the band Morning Glory. Roy Mayorga went on to play with Shelter, Soulfly, Maggott SS (featuring members of Electric Frankenstein and Degeneration), ABLOOM, Stone Sour, filling in for Igor Cavalera with Sepultura in 2006, and drumming for the reunited Amebix. Roy is currently on tour in 2016 with Ministry (band).

Popular culture
In Jackie Chan's film, Rumble in the Bronx, there is a punk seen wearing a leather jacket with 'Nausea' spray painted on the back.

Members
Al "Hoon" Long – vocals (1988–1992)
Amy Miret – vocals
Victor "Vic Venom" Dominicis – guitar
John John Jesse – bass
Roy Mayorga – drums (1989–1992)

Previous members
Brian Patton – drums (1985)
Neil Robinson – vocals (1985–1988)
Pablo Jacobson – drums (1985–1987)
Jimmy Williams – drums (1987–1988)

Discography

Official releases
Nausea demo (self released, 1988)
 Extinction LP/Cassette (1990, Profane Existence/Meantime Records)
Cybergod 7" (Allied Recordings, 1991)
Lie Cycle 7" (Graven Image Records/ Skuld Records, 1992)
Alive in Holland VHS (Channel Zero Reality/Profane Existence, 1993)
Extinction: The Second Coming CD (Selfless Records, 1993)
The Punk Terrorist Anthology Vol. 1 2xLP/CD (2004, Alternative Tentacles/Blacknoise Records)
The Punk Terrorist Anthology Vol. 2 2XLP/CD (2005, Hellbent/Blacknoise)

Compilation appearances
New York Hardcore: The Way It Is LP (Revelation Records, 1988)
Squat or Rot Volume. 1 7" (Squat or Rot Records, 1989)
They Don't Get Paid, They Don't Get Laid, But Boy Do They Work Hard LP (Maximum Rock'n'Roll, 1989)
Murders Among Us 7" (Vermiform Records, 1990)
More Songs About Plants and Trees 7" (Allied, 1991)
Discharged: From Home Front to War Front 7" (Allied, 1992)

See also
Animal rights and punk subculture

References

External links
Official Nausea website
A Recent Interview with Neil Robinson

Anarcho-punk groups
American crust and d-beat groups
20th-century squatters
Punk rock groups from New York (state)
Musical groups established in 1985
Musical groups disestablished in 1992
Alternative Tentacles artists
1985 establishments in New York City